Anne-Marie Cécile J. Neyts-Uyttebroeck (born 17 June 1944) is a Belgian politician and was a Member of the European Parliament for Flanders with the Open Flemish Liberals and Democrats, member of the Alliance of Liberals and Democrats for Europe, where she sat on the European Parliament's Committee on Foreign Affairs.

She was a third time member of the European Parliament (since June 2004), and former president of the Liberal International, from September 1999 to 2005. She was elected president of the European Liberal Democrat and Reform Party in September 2005, during a party congress in Bratislava, Slovakia.

She was a member of the Committee on Foreign Affairs and substitute for the Subcommittee on Security and Defense and a member of the Delegation for relations with NATO. She was the liberal spokesperson in the European Parliament on Foreign Affairs. She left the European Parliament on 1 January 2015.

Education
 1967: Degree in Romance philology from the Vrije Universiteit Brussel
 1970: degree in press and communication sciences (Vrije Universiteit Brussel)
 graduate teaching qualification for secondary education (1967), (Vrije Universiteit Brussel)

Career
 1966–1973: French teacher
 1993–1997: Held various offices, first in the PVV and then in the VLD, including PVV National Chairwoman (1985–1989) and VLD National Vice-Chairwoman
 Has held various offices in Liberal International
 1999: Chairwoman since September
 1982–1989: Member of the Brussels City Council
 1981–2004: Elected at various times to the national and regional parliaments (Brussels Council, the Flemish Council and the House of Representatives)
 2001–2003: Held various government offices in the regional and national governments during that period, including Brussels Minister for Finance, the Budget, Public Office and External Relations (1999–2000) and Federal Minister attached to the Foreign Ministry, with responsibility for agriculture
 1994–1999: Member of the European Parliament
 1998–1999: First Vice-Chairwoman of the ELDR Group
 Chairwoman of the Beursschouwburg (Théâtre de la Bourse)
 Chairwoman of the Vlaams-Nederlands Huis (Flemish-Dutch House)
 Chairwoman of the management council of the Foreign Trade Agency
 Co-Chairwoman of the Committee on Intercultural Dialogue

Decorations
 Officer and Commander of the Order of Leopold (Belgium)
 Knight of the Legion of Honour

References

External links
 
 
 

1944 births
Living people
Belgian Ministers of State
Ministers of Agriculture of Belgium
Chevaliers of the Légion d'honneur
Alliance of Liberals and Democrats for Europe Party
Vrije Universiteit Brussel alumni
Presidents of the Liberal International
Open Vlaamse Liberalen en Democraten MEPs
MEPs for Belgium 1994–1999
MEPs for Belgium 2004–2009
MEPs for Belgium 2009–2014
MEPs for Belgium 2014–2019
20th-century women MEPs for Belgium
21st-century women MEPs for Belgium
Women government ministers of Belgium
Belgian schoolteachers